The 1975 Wolverhampton Metropolitan Borough Council election was held on 1 May 1975.  The Labour Party retained control of the Wolverhampton Metropolitan Borough Council.

The 1975 elections were the first "one third" elections since Wolverhampton became a Metropolitan Borough and held "all out" elections in 1973, although a by-election had been held in Wednesfield Heath following the death of Cyril Squire in which the Labour Party gained the seat from the Conservatives, thus changing the composition of the Council since 1973.

The 1975 elections were contested by the Wolverhampton Association of Ratepayers (WAR) who succeeded in gaining only one seat.  Two seats were contested in the Eastfield ward following the resignation of Peter Ray.

The composition of the council prior to the election was:

Labour 41
Conservative 19

The composition of the council following the election was:

Labour 38
Conservative 21
WAR 1

Election results

WAR gain from Labour

External links

1975
1975 English local elections
1970s in the West Midlands (county)